Sue Metzger Dickey Hough (November 22, 1883 – December 28, 1980) was an American lawyer, businesswoman, and politician.

Hough was born in Lancaster, Pennsylvania and then moved to Minneapolis, Minnesota with her family when she was two years old. Her grandfather John Dickey and her uncle Oliver James Dickey were involved with politics in Pennsylvania. She graduated from Central High School in Minneapolis in 1902 and then studied at University of Chicago Law School for four years. Hough lived in Minneapolis with her husband Frank Hough and was a lawyer, involved with real estate, farm lands, and investments. Hough served in the Minnesota House of Representatives in 1923 and 1924 and was a Republican. Hough was buried in Lancaaster, Pennsylvania.

References

1883 births
1980 deaths
Politicians from Lancaster, Pennsylvania
Businesspeople from Minneapolis
Lawyers from Minneapolis
Politicians from Minneapolis
University of Chicago Law School
Women state legislators in Minnesota
Republican Party members of the Minnesota House of Representatives